Faiz Ahmed may refer to:

 Faiz Ahmed (Hyderabad cricketer) (born 1978), Indian cricketer
 Faiz Ahmed (Railways cricketer) (born 1995), Indian cricketer
 Faiz Ahmad Faiz (1911–1984), Urdu poet
 Faiz Uddin Ahmed (born 1924), former civil servant in East Pakistan, later in Bangladesh